Elizabeth Herbert may refer to:

Elizabeth Somerset, Baroness Herbert, née Elizabeth Herbert
Elizabeth Herbert, Marchioness of Powis (c. 1634–1691)
Elizabeth Herbert, Countess of Carnarvon (1752–1826)
Elizabeth "Kitty" Herbert, Countess of Carnarvon (1772–1813)
Elizabeth Herbert, Countess of Pembroke and Montgomery (1737–1831)
Elizabeth Herbert, Baroness Herbert of Lea (1822–1911)